The Island Junior Hockey League (IJHL), also sometimes called the PEI Junior A Hockey League, was a Junior ice hockey league in Prince Edward Island, Canada.  Originally Junior B, the league was promoted to Junior A in 1973 after the folding of the Charlottetown Islanders in 1972.

History
The league was promoted to Junior A in 1973.  Most of the teams originated from the Island Junior B Hockey League, except for the Charlottetown Abbies who played the previous season in the Central New Brunswick Junior B Hockey League.  In its early years, their champions would play the winners of the New Brunswick Junior Hockey League, Eastern Junior A Hockey League, and Newfoundland Junior A Hockey League for advancement in the Centennial Cup playdowns.

In 1989, the Summerside Western Capitals hosted the Canadian Junior A Championship, then known as the Manitoba Centennial Cup, and represented the IJHL at the tourney.  The Western Capitals came in second place, losing to the Thunder Bay Flyers of the United States Hockey League 4–1 in the final after beating the Moncton Hawks 3–2 in a triple-overtime thriller in the semi-final.  The Western Capitals and the Charlottetown Abbies severed ties with the IJHL in 1991, to join the Maritime Junior A Hockey League.

In 1991, the Charlottetown Abbies and Summerside Western Capitals jumped from the Island Junior Hockey League to the Metro Valley Junior Hockey League.  The jump caused the end of the IJHL and caused the MVJHL to change its name to the Maritime Junior A Hockey League

In 1996, a new Island Junior Hockey League was founded at the Junior B level.

Teams
Charlottetown Abbies
Charlottetown Colonels
Eastern Huskies
Monague Kings
North River North Stars
O'Leary Maroons
Riverview Buccaneers
Saint John Schooners
Sherwood-Parkdale Metros
Summerside Western Capitals
West Prince Bluefins

Champions
Jr. B
1972 Summerside Crystals
1973 
Jr. A
1974 Charlottetown Colonels
1975 Charlottetown Colonels
1976 Charlottetown Colonels
1977 Charlottetown Generals
1978 Charlottetown Eagles
1979 Sherwood-Parkdale Metros
1980 Sherwood-Parkdale Metros
1981 Sherwood-Parkdale Metros
1982 North River North Stars
1983 Sherwood-Parkdale Metros
1984 Summerside Western Capitals
1985 Charlottetown Eagles
1986 Summerside Western Capitals
1987 Charlottetown Abbies
1988 Summerside Western Capitals
1989 Summerside Western Capitals
1990 Charlottetown Abbies
1991 Charlottetown Abbies

See also
List of ice hockey teams in Prince Edward Island

External links
Canadian Junior A Website
Current IJHL Website

Defunct ice hockey leagues in Prince Edward Island